Juan Seguí (born 21 July 1947) is a Spanish former sport shooter who competed in the 1976 Summer Olympics, in the 1980 Summer Olympics, in the 1984 Summer Olympics, in the 1988 Summer Olympics, in the 1992 Summer Olympics.

References

1947 births
Living people
Spanish male sport shooters
ISSF pistol shooters
Olympic shooters of Spain
Shooters at the 1976 Summer Olympics
Shooters at the 1980 Summer Olympics
Shooters at the 1984 Summer Olympics
Shooters at the 1988 Summer Olympics
Shooters at the 1992 Summer Olympics
20th-century Spanish people